Anthony "Tony" Cardoza (May 26, 1930 – December 7, 2015) was an American actor and film producer. A number of the B-movies that he produced are considered to be among the all-time worst, and were immortalized through Mystery Science Theater 3000.

Early years 
Cardoza was born in Hartford, Connecticut.

Military service 
Before becoming involved in the film industry, Cardoza was a Staff Sgt. in the U.S. Army 3rd infantry division, being a Sgt. Gunner on the 105 mm Howitzer in the Korean War. He was awarded two Bronze Battle Stars, the Good Conduct Medal, Korean War Medal, Sharp Shooters medal, Presidents Medal, The Syngman Rhee Presidential Medal, The Asian War Medal, and others. Just prior to his Honorable Discharge, he was assigned to escort duty (escorting deceased soldiers to their loved ones).

Manufacturing career 
After his discharge from the Army, Cardoza worked for Pratt & Whitney Aircraft in East Hartford, Connecticut, as a Heliarc welder on J-57 Jet engines, a trade he continued making a living from for a number of years into his show business career. However, in 1963, a doctor advised him to stop welding because of chalazion forming under his eyelids.

Film career 
Cardoza worked on over a dozen films, but is perhaps best known for his three collaborations with Coleman Francis in the 1960s: The Beast of Yucca Flats, The Skydivers, and Red Zone Cuba.

Cardoza's work would be remembered in the 1990s television series Mystery Science Theater 3000, as four of his five films would be lampooned – his three collaborations with Coleman Francis, and The Hellcats.

Personal life 
Cardoza was married to Joy Wilkerson, an experienced auto racing driver. They had a daughter, Kim.

Death 
Cardoza died December 7, 2015, as a result of complications from a stroke.

Selected filmography 
 Final Curtain
 Night of the Ghouls
 The Beast of Yucca Flats
 The Skydivers
 Red Zone Cuba
 The Hellcats
 Bigfoot
 Outlaw Riders
 Smokey and the Hotwire Gang
 Inside Out Upside Down
 Crime of Crimes
 Raw Force
 Heated Vengeance
 Misfit Patrol

Television 
 The Joy Wilkerson TV Talk Variety Show – 46 episodes writer/producer/director (1974–1975)

References

External links 
 
 B-Monster: Profile: Anthony Cardoza's Tor of the Desert, by Tom Weaver
 Interview with Anthony Cardoza

1930 births
2015 deaths
American male film actors
Male actors from Hartford, Connecticut
Film producers from Connecticut